The Philippines–Venezuela relations refers to the diplomatic relations between Venezuela and the Philippines. 
The two countries share a Hispanic heritage. Filipino and Venezuelan relations even predates the establishment of these specific nations. Both the Philippines and Venezuela were part of the same Spanish administrative division, the Viceroyalty of New Spain. During this time, people from the Philippines and Venezuela freely moved into each other’s areas since they were considered one cohesive territory. Venezuelan participation in Philippine affairs even endured after Venezuelan independence since it is recorded that Venezuelans were among the Latin American soldiers and officers supporting Emperor Andrés Novales of the Philippines, in his short lived revolt against Spain. In 2022 there is international cooperation between the Philippines and Venezuela; for example, both nations are beauty pageant powerhouses, and in relation to this, the Venezuelan winner of Mr. International 2013, José Anmer Paredes, came to the Philippines to help relaunch the Philippine division of Mr. International, together with 2013 Mr. International Neil Perez of the Philippines; 2018 Mr. International Seung Hwan Lee of South Korea; and 2019 Mr. International Trịnh Văn Bảo of Vietnam. Bilateral Relations between the two countries has been warm and friendly since it formal establishment of ties on 27 August 1968. Venezuela has an embassy in Manila and the Philippines is accredited to Venezuela through its embassy in Brasilia.

Agreements
Venezuelan President Hugo Chavez made a state visit in the Philippines in 1999 and signed the RP-Venezuela Memorandum of Understanding on Tourism Cooperation and a Memorandum of Understanding on Trade and Investment.

Economic relations
Venezuela is the Philippines' 5th largest trading partner in South America with Philippine exports increasing to 38 million dollars in 2004, compared to just 1.6 million dollars of 2003. The Philippines is willing to work with Venezuela in both energy and power industries.

See also
 Foreign relations of the Philippines
 Foreign relations of Venezuela

References

Venezuela
Bilateral relations of Venezuela